Eloise Salutes the Stars is a talk show hosted by Eloise McElhone (1921-1974) which aired on an 8-station network including the DuMont flagship station WABD. The series started on WABD in November 1949. The series aired Tuesdays at 7:30pm ET in 1950 and early 1951. Other stations in the network such as WXEL-TV in Cleveland showed the series on Thursdays at 7:30pm ET, and other stations, such as WPIX-TV chose to air the show at 5:15pm ET.

The show was sponsored by Doeskin Tissues, and produced by Lester Lewis (1913-1988). After the original 13 episodes were produced, the show was renewed for another 13 episodes in January 1951.

McElhone was also host of the DuMont series Quick on the Draw, a panelist on the ABC game show Think Fast, and a panelist on the NBC/ABC series Leave It to the Girls.

Episode status
Two episodes are held in the J. Fred MacDonald collection at the Library of Congress.

Bibliography
David Weinstein, The Forgotten Network: DuMont and the Birth of American Television (Philadelphia: Temple University Press, 2004) 
Alex McNeil, Total Television, Fourth edition (New York: Penguin Books, 1980) 
Tim Brooks and Earle Marsh, The Complete Directory to Prime Time Network TV Shows, Third edition (New York: Ballantine Books, 1964)

References

See also
List of programs broadcast by the DuMont Television Network
List of surviving DuMont Television Network broadcasts
Highway to the Stars
Look Upon a Star

DuMont Television Network original programming
1950 American television series debuts
1951 American television series endings
Black-and-white American television shows